Melanie Kay "Meadow" Williams (born February 10, 1966) is an American actress and producer. She began her career appearing in small roles in films including Beverly Hills Cop III (1994), The Mask (1994) and Apollo 13 (1995). In the 2000s, Williams began working as film producer; her credits include The Harvest (2013), Den of Thieves (2018), After (2019), and Boss Level (2020). She played Mildred Gillars in the 2021 drama film American Traitor: The Trial of Axis Sally, which she also financed.

Williams' acting talent and professional conduct as a film producer were criticized by her American Traitor co-star, Al Pacino.

Life and career
Melanie Kay Williams was born in Miami, Florida and grew up in Tennessee. She began performing in high school and later moved to New York City for work as a model. In New York, Williams studied acting at Larry Moss Studio and later moved to Los Angeles when she began appearing in episodes of television series include Murder, She Wrote, Dream On and Married... with Children. Williams also had secondary roles in films Beverly Hills Cop III (1994), The Mask (1994) and Apollo 13 (1995).

In 2008, Williams began producing and starring in the independent films, include the leading roles in Skeletons in the Desert (2008), Raven (2010), and Mysteria (2011). She produced and co-starred opposite Samantha Morton in the 2013 horror film The Harvest, and well as action film Den of Thieves (2018) and romantic drama After (2019). In 2017, she won Daytime Emmy Award for Outstanding Digital Daytime Drama Series as a producer of web-series The Bay. She starred opposite Sylvester Stallone in the 2018 action film Backtrace, and alongside Bruce Willis in the 2019 thriller 10 Minutes Gone. She next played the role of Mildred Gillars in the drama film American Traitor: The Trial of Axis Sally opposite Al Pacino.

Criticism of Williams by Al Pacino 
Williams' American Traitor co-star Al Pacino criticized her acting performance in the film, as well as her professionalism as a producer on the project.

In a 2019 email to producer Randall Emmett, Pacino suggested adding another shooting day to the film "to help [Williams] give a better performance".

"Let's do this Randall. I'm not going for the A's or the B's. I’m going for something between C and B. I don't like Ds," wrote Pacino, "And, as long as you put the effort in with what you know about filmmaking and Michael too I'm sure we'll get to a B-. And that's good enough for me, if it's good enough for you."

Pacino also complained that Williams was interfering with director Michael Polish's editing process. "My thought Randall is very simple. She is not a professional. ... Someone has to say 'back off a second dear, we're completing the film still, take a look when it's ready'," Pacino wrote to Emmett.

Personal life 
She was married to her first husband until 2010. In 2010, she married Gerald Kessler, a vitamin tycoon multi-millionaire. Kessler died in 2015 and she inherited almost all of his $800 million estate, which was the subject of legal action by Kessler's children from his previous marriage. Since 2017 she has been dating actor Swen Temmel.

Filmography

Film

Television

References

External links
 

1966 births
Living people
20th-century American actresses
21st-century American actresses
21st-century American businesspeople
Actresses from Miami
American film actresses
American film producers
American television actresses
American women film producers
Businesspeople from Miami
Film producers from Florida